The Women's Discus Throw event at the 2005 World Championships in Athletics was held at the Helsinki Olympic Stadium on August 7 and August 11.

Medalists

Schedule
All times are Eastern European Time (UTC+2)

Abbreviations
All results shown are in metres

Qualifying

Group A
  Věra Pospíšilová-Cechlová, Czech Republic 64.26 m Q
  Aimin Song, China 64.15 m Q
  Dragana Tomašević, Serbia and Montenegro 62.02 m Q
  Olena Antonova, Ukraine 61.05 m Q
  Joanna Wiśniewska, Poland 59.66 m q
  Elizna Naude, South Africa 58.93 m
  Oksana Yesipchuk, Russia 58.32 m
  Marzena Wysocka, Poland 57.44 m
  Neelam Jaswant Singh, India 56.70 m – disqualified after failing a doping test
  Tereapii Tapoki, Cook Islands 50.92 m
  Aretha Thurmond, United States 47.15 m

Group B
  Natalya Sadova, Russia 63.65 m Q
  Franka Dietzsch, Germany 63.53 m Q
  Nicoleta Grasu, Romania 62.06 m Q
  Anna Söderberg, Sweden 59.94 m q
  Beatrice Faumuina, New Zealand 59.81 m q
  Shuli Ma, China 59.43 m q
  Natalya Fokina, Ukraine 59.30 m q
  Yania Ferrales, Cuba 58.38 m
  Seilala Sua, United States 57.68 m
  Becky Breisch, United States 57.16 m
  Wioletta Potępa, Poland 56.31 m

Final

External links
IAAF results, heats
IAAF results, final

Discus
Discus throw at the World Athletics Championships
2005 in women's athletics